The Western Independence Party of Manitoba ran six candidates in the 1990 provincial election, none of whom were elected.

Jan Mandseth (Fort Garry)

Mandseth received 249 votes (2.30%), finishing fourth against Progressive Conservative candidate Rosemary Vodrey.

References

Candidates in Manitoba provincial elections